The 2012–13 Long Beach State 49ers men's basketball team represents California State University, Long Beach during the 2012–13 NCAA Division I men's basketball season. The 49ers, led by sixth year head coach Dan Monson, play their home games at Walter Pyramid and are members of the Big West Conference.

With the departure of conference player of the year Casper Ware, James Ennis became the go to player for the 49ers in 2012–13. He responded by averaging 16.5 points and 6.7 rebounds per game and leading the 49ers to another regular season Big West championship. At the end of the season, Ennis was named Big West Player of the Year and an AP honorable mention All-American.

Following the close of his senior year, Ennis was named to the Reese's College All-Star Game, where he led the East team in scoring with 13 points, including a pair of baskets that clinched the game.

Roster

Schedule

|-
!colspan=9| Regular Season

|-
!colspan=9| 2013 Big West Conference men's basketball tournament

|-
!colspan=9| 2013 NIT

References

Long Beach State Beach men's basketball seasons
Long Beach
Long Beach
Long Beach State 49ers men's basketball team
Long Beach State 49ers men's basketball team